Stephen DiRado (born 1957) is an American photographer. His work is mostly black-and-white, and he makes frequent use of large-format cameras. He is most noted for his portraiture, night-astronomical photography, and semi-composed group photography, and for the extensive length of his projects.

He has been the recipient of fellowships from the John Simon Guggenheim Memorial Foundation, the Massachusetts Cultural Council, National Endowment for the Arts and the Massachusetts Artist Foundation. He has taken part in solo and group exhibitions at venues including the DeCordova and at the Museum of Fine Arts in Boston. His work is held in both public and private collections and has appeared in print in The New York Times Magazine.

DiRado's long term project, With Dad, was awarded the 2018 Bob and Diane Fund.
The book, With Dad, is a photographic journal that vividly articulates a son’s connections, captured through his camera, as his father succumbs to Alzheimer’s. Experience the love, dignity and profound intimacy shared between Stephen DiRado and his family over a chronological span of twenty years. Published by Davis Art in 2019.  
  

He is currently a Professor of Practice in photography within the Visual and Performing Arts Department at Clark University.

Selected exhibitions

 Great River Arts, Bellows Falls, VT, "H2O, Film on Water" 2009
 Fitchburg Art Museum, Fitchburg, MA "Stephen DiRado's Dinner Series: How We Lived" 2008
 DeCordova Museum and Sculpture Park, Lincoln, MA, "JUMP" 2007
 Currier Museum of Art, Manchester, NH, New Acquisitions Show 2004
 Denis Bibro Fine Arts, New York, NY, "About Face" 2004
 Yossi Milo Gallery, New York, NY. "By The Sea" 
 DeCordova Museum and Sculpture Park, Lincoln, MA. "Landscapes Seen and Imagined: Part II" 2003
 Tom Blau Gallery, London, UK, Celestial Series 2002
 Houston Center for Photography, Houston, TX, "Stephen DiRado, Dinner Table Series" 2002
 Museum of Fine Arts, Boston, MA "Lens Landscape" 2002
 The Photography Armory Show, New York, NY, Celestial Series 2002
 DeCordova Museum and Sculpture Park, Lincoln, MA. " Alone" 2002
 DeCordova Museum and Sculpture Park, Lincoln, MA. " Landscapes Seen and Imagined: Sense of Place" 2001
 Dorsky Gallery, (SOHO) New York City, NY, "At the Edge" 2001
 Robert Klein Gallery, Boston, MA, " Night Light" 2001
 The Afterimage Photograph Gallery, Dallas, TX, "Still Lifes" 2000
 MTA, Transit for Arts, Penn Station, New York City, NY, "Celestial Photographs" 2000
 Museum of Fine Arts, Houston, TX, "MFA, Houston: Recent Acquisitions" 1997
 Afterimage Photograph Gallery, Dallas, TX, "Nighttime" 1997
 Toledo Museum of Art, Center for the Visual Arts, Toledo, OH," Beach People" 1995
 The Vineyard Museum, Edgartown, MA, "Beach People" 1994
 Photographic Resource Center, Boston, MA, The New England Biennial 1993
 University Art Gallery, University of Massachusetts Dartmouth, North Dartmouth, MA, Jacob's House 1993
 DeCordova Museum and Sculpture Park, Lincoln, MA," Beach People" 1992
 Akin Gallery, Boston, MA, "Photo Constructions" 1991
 Worcester Art Museum, Worcester, MA, "Galleria Series" 1986
 Philadelphia Art Alliance, Philadelphia, PA, "Galleria Series" 1986
 Grove Street Gallery, Worcester, MA, "Bell Pond, Portrait of A Community" 1984

Selected collections

 Natural History Museum, Berlin, Germany
 Currier Museum of Art, Manchester, NH
 Danforth Museum, Framingham, MA
 DeCordova Museum and Sculpture Park, Lincoln, MA
 Fitchburg Art Museum, Fitchburg, MA
 Lamar Dodd Art Center, LaGrange, GA
 Museum of Fine Arts, Boston, MA
 Museum of Fine Arts, Houston, TX
 New Britain Museum of Art, New Britain, CT
 New Hampshire Institute of Art, Teti Collection, Manchester, NH
 Polaroid Corporation, Dallas, TX
 Vineyard Museum, Edgartown, MA
 Worcester Art Museum, Worcester, MA
 Worcester Historical Museum, Worcester, MA

Selected publications

 Esopus, Fall 2009, Issue 13, Artist's Project: Oliver Herring and Peter Krashes. Photograph Portraits of Herring and Krashes.
 New York Times Magazine, September 6, 2009, The Way We Live Now, article by Walter Kirn: A Pharmacological Education
 Boston Globe Arts Magazine, September 11, 2009, Shimmering Downriver, Cate McQuad. Review of exhibition.

Notes and references

External links
Official Website
Clark University Faculty Page
Interview with Alec Soth
lenscratch review
One Eight Nine review of handmade book With Dad
WICN interview
John Simon Guggenheim Memorial Foundation Bio Page

1957 births
Living people
American photographers
Clark University faculty